The 13th edition of the Ronde van Drenthe, a women's cycling race in the Netherlands, was held on 17 March 2019. Italian Marta Bastianelli won the race in a three-way sprint before Dutch riders Chantal Blaak and Ellen van Dijk.

The race started and finished in Hoogeveen, covering eleven cobbled sections and three ascents of the VAM-berg. It was the second event of the 2019 UCI Women's World Tour.

Teams
20 UCI teams entered the race, as well as a Dutch national team. Each team has a maximum of six riders:

Result

References 

2019 UCI Women's World Tour